24 Oras is a Philippine television news broadcasting show that premiered on GMA Network on March 15, 2004. Produced by GMA Integrated News and Public Affairs, the newscast features news reports; national weather forecasts; interviews by GMA Integrated News personalities, reporters, and correspondents covering events around the world; sports highlights; and segments such as Chika Minute (entertainment) and Kapusong Totoo (public service). 24 Oras initially featured Mel Tiangco and Mike Enriquez; the newscast's anchors changed significantly during its run.

Since its premiere, 24 Oras has been widely recognized as one of the network's most-trusted newscasts. It has enjoyed consistently high viewership on broadcast television, according to AGB Nielsen Philippines and Kantar Media Philippines. 24 Oras has had a significant impact on social media as a result of the COVID-19 pandemic, expanding its livestreaming to worldwide and TikTok, the first newscast to do so.

The newscast has received various awards and nominations. 24 Oras won four awards for Most Popular TV Program News & Public Affairs from the Box Office Entertainment Awards. It received five Asian Academy Creative Award nominations (winning one) and forty-nine for PMPC Star Awards for Television (winning nine). 24 Oras was nominated for the news category at the 2013 International Emmy Awards Current Affairs & News, and in 2014, the newscast was recognized with a Peabody Award.

Accolades

Notes

References

External links
 

24 Oras